Michael Douglas Peters (August 6, 1948 – August 29, 1994) was an African American choreographer and director who is best known for his innovative choreography in music videos.

Early life
Michael Douglas Peters was born in Williamsburg, Brooklyn on August 6, 1948, to an African American father and a Jewish mother. His mother enrolled him in his first dance class at the age of 4 because all he ever did was dance around the house. Peters was inspired by Broadway musicals such as “My Fair Lady” and “West Side Story” to pursue a career in the performing arts. He grew up in a housing project in Brooklyn where he experienced gang wars in the neighborhood which would later inspire his choreography. Once Peters saw how much he related to “West Side Story”, he decided to pursue a career in dance. Michael attended Fiorello H. LaGuardia High school of Music & Art and Performing Arts for four years. Despite his high IQ, Peters disliked school and would later drop out. He continued to dance at the Bernice Johnson Cultural Arts Center in Queens, NY.

Professional career
At the beginning of his career, Michael Peters appeared in many Broadway shows as a featured dancer. These shows include The Wiz, Raisin, Purlie, Billie, and Me and Bessie. He danced with modern dance choreographers such as Talley Beatty, Alvin Ailey, Bernice Johnson, and Fred Benjamin.

Peters had his first big breakthrough when he choreographed Donna Summer's "Love to Love You Baby" in 1975. Peters would later go on to set the stage for commercial dance when he choreographed for music videos, such as Lionel Richie's "Hello", Pat Benatar's "Love is a Battlefield", and Michael Jackson's "Thriller" and "Beat It". Peters was among the first choreographers to establish a name as a music video choreographer. He was referred to as the "Balanchine of MTV" because he knew what would look good on screen.
 
Peters would not only choreograph for these music videos but he would also appear as a dancer. He can be seen in "Beat It" as the dancing rival gang leader dressed in all white, "Hello" as the one who teaches Richie's blind date to dance, a brief cameo in "Love is a Battlefield" and Lionel Richie's "Running with the Night".  Peters would also go on to choreograph for Diana Ross' Central Park Concert in July 1983, "For One & For All". He would continue to work with Ross when he danced in Ross' "Manic" and "Pieces of Ice".

Peters has helped choreograph for the movies ‘’The Jacksons: An American Dream’’ in 1992 and Angela Bassett transform into Tina TurnerWhat's Love Got to Do with It in 1993. Peters continued to choreograph for films such as Sister Act 2, What's Love Got To Do, The Mambo Kings, The Five Heartbeats, Sarafina, 13 going on 30, The Movie Awards, the Blue Hour, Soul, and Scott Joplin.
Peters's choreography credits also include TV Specials including "Head of the Class", and "The Pointer Sisters: Up All Nite". Peters would direct his first Broadway musical, "Leader in Pack" in 1985. He also directed episodes for many TV series such as "New Kids on the Block", "Knots Landing," "Fresh Prince of Bel-Air", " "A Different World" and "Fame".

In 1993, Peters began to advocate for more acknowledgments for choreography in films and would later start a campaign for an Oscar for choreography. He died of AIDS in Los Angeles, California on August 29, 1994, at the age of 46.

Awards and nominations
 1982 Tony Award for Best Choreography – Dreamgirls
 1987 Primetime Emmy Award for Outstanding Choreography – Liberty Weekend
 1993 Primetime Emmy Award for Outstanding Choreography – The Jacksons: An American Dream
 1994 American Choreography Award for Outstanding Achievement in a Feature Film – What's Love Got to Do with It

References

External links
 
 

1948 births
1994 deaths
African-American choreographers
African-American Jews
African-American television directors
AIDS-related deaths in California
American choreographers
American jazz dancers
American television directors
Emmy Award winners
Fiorello H. LaGuardia High School alumni
Tony Award winners
People from Williamsburg, Brooklyn
20th-century African-American people